Edmunds County is a county in the U.S. state of South Dakota. At the 2020 census, the population was 3,986. Its county seat is Ipswich. The county was established in 1873 and organized in 1883. It is named for Newton Edmunds, the second Governor of Dakota Territory.

Edmunds County is part of the Aberdeen, SD Micropolitan Statistical Area.

Geography
The terrain of Edmunds County consists of rolling hills, mostly dedicated to agriculture. The terrain's highest point is on the west portion of the north boundary line, at 1,978' (603m) ASL.

Major highways

  U.S. Highway 12
  South Dakota Highway 45
  South Dakota Highway 47
  South Dakota Highway 247
  South Dakota Highway 253

Adjacent counties

 McPherson County - north
 Brown County - east
 Faulk County - south
 Potter County - southwest
 Walworth County - west

Protected areas

 Bowdle-Hosmer State Game Production Area
 Heilman State Game Production Area
 Hosmer State Game Production Area
 Light State Game Production Area
 Losee State Game Production Area
 Mina Lake State Recreation Area
 Mina State Game Production Area
 North Scatterwood State Game Production Area
 Rosette State Game Production Area
 Schaber State Game Production Area
 Shaner State Game Production Area
 Steigelmier State Game Production Area

Lakes

 Alkali Lake
 Bowdle-Hosmer Lake
 Grass Lake
 Lake Parmley
 North Scatterwood Lake (partial)

Demographics

2000 census
In the 2000 census, there were 4,367 people, 1,681 households and 1,210 families in the county. The racial make-up of the county was 99.20% White, 0.07% Black or African American, 0.25% Native American, 0.09% Asian, 0.02% Pacific Islander, 0.05% from other races, and 0.32% from two or more races. 0.48% of the population were Hispanic or Latino of any race. 69.4% were of German and 6.2% Norwegian ancestry.

There were 1,681 households, of which 31.50% had children under the age of 18 living with them, 64.90% were married couples living together, 4.80% had a female householder with no husband present, and 28.00% were non-families. 25.60% of all households were made up of individuals, and 15.00% had someone living alone who was 65 years of age or older. The average household size was 2.52 and the average family size was 3.04.

26.70% of the population were under the age of 18, 5.10% from 18 to 24, 23.30% from 25 to 44, 22.70% from 45 to 64, and 22.20% who were 65 years of age or older. The median age was 42 years. For every 100 females, there were 97.20 males. For every 100 females age 18 and over, there were 94.30 males.

The median household income was $32,205 and the median family income was $37,174. Males had a median income of $26,609 and females $18,080. The per capita income was $16,149. About 10.40% of families and 13.80% of the population were below the poverty line, including 16.80% of those under age 18 and 14.00% of those age 65 or over.

2010 census
At the 2010 census, there were 4,071 people, 1,607 households and 1,057 families residing in the county. The racial make-up of the county was 97.8% white, 0.4% American Indian, 0.1% black or African American, 0.1% Asian, 0.5% from other races, and 1.0% from two or more races. Those of Hispanic or Latino origin made up 1.4% of the population. In terms of ancestry, 70.8% were German, 11.4% were Norwegian, 10.1% were Russian, 5.9% were English and 2.4% were American.

Of the 1,607 households, 26.4% had children under the age of 18 living with them, 58.9% were married couples living together, 4.0% had a female householder with no husband present, 34.2% were non-families, and 31.0% of all households were made up of individuals. The average household size was 2.27 and the average family size was 2.84. The median age was 45.7 years.

The median household income was $47,026 and the median family income was $56,599. Males had a median income of $37,713 and females $26,287. The per capita income was $24,268. About 6.9% of families and 11.6% of the population were below the poverty line, including 11.0% of those under age 18 and 13.6% of those age 65 or over.

Notable events

Edmunds County is where the Learjet of the PGA golfer Payne Stewart crashed, killing him and five others on board. The plane crashed just south of the community of Mina at the approximate coordinates of 45°25' N 98°45' W.

Communities

Cities

 Bowdle
 Hosmer
 Ipswich (county seat)
 Roscoe

Census-designated place 

 Deerfield Colony
 Mina
 Pembrook Colony
 Plainview Colony

Unincorporated communities

 Beebe
 Craven
 Gretna
 Loyalton
 Powell

Townships

 Adrian
 Belle
 Bowdle
 Bryant
 Clear Lake
 Cleveland
 Cloyd
 Cordlandt
 Cottonwood Lake
 Fountain
 Glen
 Glover
 Harmony
 Hillside
 Hosmer
 Hudson
 Huntley
 Ipswich
 Kent
 Liberty
 Madison
 Modena
 Montpelier
 North Bryant
 Odessa
 Pembrook
 Powell
 Richland
 Rosette
 Sangamon
 Union
 Vermont

Politics
Edmunds County voters have long been reliably Republican. Since 1936, in only three elections has the county selected the Democratic Party candidate. Although it was one of only 129 counties nationwide to back George McGovern in his landslide 1972 defeat, it has voted for fewer Democratic presidential nominees (six) than any other county McGovern carried, with Jimmy Carter in 1976 the last Democrat to carry the county and Hillary Clinton not passing twenty percent in 2016.

See also
 National Register of Historic Places listings in Edmunds County, South Dakota

References

 
Aberdeen, South Dakota micropolitan area
1883 establishments in Dakota Territory
Populated places established in 1883